Cerosterna pulchellator is a species of beetle in the family Cerambycidae. It was described by Westwood in 1837. It is known from Thailand and the Philippines.

Subspecies
 Cerosterna pulchellator pulchellator (Westwood, 1837)
 Cerosterna pulchellator argenteomaculata Aurivillius 1887

References

Lamiini
Beetles described in 1837